Schinia mortua is a moth of the family Noctuidae. It is found in most of the western half of North America.

The wingspan is 23–27 mm.

The larvae feed on Grindelia and Haplopappus.

External links
Images
Butterflies and Moths of North America

Schinia
Moths of North America
Moths described in 1865

Taxa named by Augustus Radcliffe Grote